Lulunga is an island group and a district in Haʻapai administrative division of the Kingdom of Tonga. The archipelago consists of 17 islands, only 5 of which are inhabited. These are Haʻafeva, Matuku, Kotu, ʻOʻua and Tungua. The population of the whole island chain is 923, most of whom live on Haʻafeva.

List of islands
 Fakahiku
 Fetoa
 Fonuaika
 Foua
 Haafeva
 Kito
 Kotu
 Lekeleka
 Luanamo
 Matuku
 Nukulei
 Pepea
 Putuputua
 Teaupa
 Tokulu
 Tungua
 Oua

References

Islands of Tonga